Lady Vengeance (titled Sympathy for Lady Vengeance in Australia and Russia) is a 2005 South Korean psychological thriller film directed by Park Chan-wook. The film is the third and final installment in Park's Vengeance Trilogy, following Sympathy for Mr. Vengeance (2002) and Oldboy (2003). It stars Lee Young-ae as Lee Geum-ja, a woman released from prison after serving the sentence for a murder she did not commit. The film tells her story of revenge against the real murderer.

The film debuted on 29 July 2005 in South Korea, and competed for the Golden Lion at the 62nd Venice International Film Festival in September 2005. While it failed to win in competition, it did walk away with Cinema of The Future, the Young Lion Award, and the Best Innovated Film Award in the non-competition section. It won the award for Best Film at the 26th Blue Dragon Film Awards. The film had its US premiere on 30 September 2005 at the New York Film Festival. It began its limited release in North American theatres on 5 May 2006, to favorable reviews from critics.

Plot
A Christian musical procession waits with a symbolic block of tofu outside a prison for the release of Lee Geum-ja (Lee Young-ae), a reformed female prisoner. Convicted of kidnapping and murdering a 6-year-old schoolboy, Won-mo, 13 years earlier, Geum-ja became a national sensation because of her young age, angelic appearance, and eager confession to the crime. However, she became an inspirational model for prisoner reform during her incarceration, and her apparent spiritual transformation earned her an early release. Free, she is now intent on revenge.

Geum-ja quickly shows that her "kind-hearted" behavior in prison was a cover to earn favor and further her revenge plans. She visits the other paroled inmates, calling in favors that include food, shelter, and weapons. She begins work in a pastry shop and starts an affair with a young shop assistant, Geun-Shik, who would be the same age as Won-mo, had he lived.

It is revealed that Geum-ja did not smother Won-mo. The detective on her case was aware of her innocence, but helped her fake crime-scene details to ensure her confession looked credible. As a young high school student, Geum-ja had become pregnant and, afraid to go home to her parents, turned to Mr. Baek (Choi Min-sik), a teacher from her school, for help. Mr. Baek expected Geum-ja to provide sex and assist in his kidnapping racket in return. He used her to lure 5-year-old Won-mo to him, with the intent of ransoming the child, but murdered the boy. He then kidnapped Geum-ja's infant daughter and threatened to murder the baby if Geum-ja did not take the blame. She has spent her time in prison planning revenge on Mr. Baek for the murder of Won-mo, causing Geum-ja's child to grow up without a mother, and for sending her to prison.
    
Geum-ja discovers that her daughter was adopted by Australian parents. Jenny, now an adolescent, does not speak Korean and does not initially embrace her mother, though she does return with Geum-ja to Seoul to bond. Geum-ja plans to kidnap and murder Mr. Baek, now a children's teacher at a preschool, with the aid of his wife, another ex-convict. Mr. Baek hires thugs to kill Geum-ja and Jenny but Geum-ja kills them and Mr. Baek is subdued.

Mr. Baek wakes up tied to a chair in an abandoned schoolhouse. On his cell phone strap, Geum-ja discovers the orange marble from Won-mo's crime scene, which had been taken as a trophy, and is horrified to see other children's trinkets also on the strap. After shooting him in both feet, she discovers snuff tapes in his apartment of the other children he had murdered. He had not been part of a ransoming racket; he would kidnap and murder a child from each school he worked at because he found them annoying. After killing each one, he would fake a ransom call to the parents, collect the money, and move on to a different school.

Sickened that four more children died because Geum-ja did not turn in the real killer 13 years ago, Geum-ja and the original case detective contact the parents and relatives of the missing children to the school. After watching each tape, the group decides to murder Mr. Baek together. They take turns beating, mutilating and torturing him until he is dead, then take a group photo, ensuring that none of them can turn in the others without implicating themselves. They then bury the corpse outside.

Geum-ja, the detective, and the relatives all converge at Geum-ja's bakery. Afterward, she sees the ghost of the murdered child who then transforms into his grown self (the age that he would have been if he had lived). Later, she meets Jenny and instructs her daughter to live purely, like tofu. She buries her face in an all white frosting covered cake and weeps as Jenny hugs her.

Cast

 Lee Young-ae as Lee Geum-ja
 Choi Min-sik as Mr. Baek (Baek Han-sang)
 Kwon Yea-young as Jenny
 Kim Si-hoo as Geun-shik
 Oh Dal-su as Mr. Chang
 Lee Seung-shin as Park Yi-jeong
 Go Soo-hee as Ma-nyeo ("Witch")
 Kim Byeong-ok as The Preacher
 Ra Mi-ran as Oh Su-hee
 Seo Young-ju as Kim Yang-hee
 Kim Boo-seon as Woo So-young
 Ko Chang-seok as So-young's husband
 Lee Dae-yeon as parent of abducted child
 Nam Il-woo as Detective Choi
 Kim Hee-soo as Se-hyun
 Oh Kwang-rok as Se-hyun's father
 Lee Byung-joon as Dong-hwa
 Choi Jung-woo as Dong-hwa's father
 Ryoo Seung-wan as passerby
 Song Kang-ho as assassin 1
 Shin Ha-kyun as assassin 2
 Yoo Ji-tae as grown-up Won-mo, as seen in a vision
 Seo Ji-hee as Eun-joo
 Won Mi-won as Eun-joo's grandmother
 Kim Ik-tae as Won-mo's father
 Kim Yoo-jung as Jae-kyung
 Im Soo-kyung as prison officer
 Choi Hee-jin as prisoner 3
 Jeon Sung-ae as prisoner 4
 Kim Jin-goo as Ko Seon-sook
 Kang Hye-jung as TV announcer
 Tony Barry as Jenny's adoptive father
 Anne Cordiner as Jenny's adoptive mother

Production

Music
The film's score, composed by Choi Seung-hyun, is heavily baroque-themed, featuring many pieces with harpsichord, baroque guitars, and other instruments. The main theme is an edited version of Vivaldi's "Ah ch'infelice sempre" from "Cessate, omai cessate". The song is appropriate since the unedited version's melody is sung by a woman who is seeking revenge on a man who has betrayed her, much like the film itself. The 24th Caprice by Paganini also appears many times. The final scene is accompanied by an arrangement by Jordi Savall of the Spanish song Mareta, a lullaby in the Valencian language by an anonymous 17th century composer from Alicante.

Fade to Black and White version
Two versions of the film exist, the standard version and the "Fade to Black and White version". The latter version begins in full colour, but throughout the film the colour gradually fades until it is totally black and white at the end of the film. In conjunction with the camera technique of removing the colours, there is also a change in the environmental colours used in backgrounds and clothing. At the beginning of the film, the environments contain a lot of primary colours, whereas toward the end of the film pastel shades, blacks and whites are used. Geum-ja wears a blue coat in the early part of the film, but this is replaced with a black leather coat at the end. The brightly coloured walls of the prison and Geum-ja's bedroom are replaced with the grey walls of the school.

Both versions of the film were shown in Korean cinemas, although the fading version was presented only in digital format at a few DLP-equipped multiplexes.

This version has since been made available on the Korean Special Edition DVD of Lady Vengeance (with DTS audio only), and in the Tartan Films DVD and Blu-ray boxset releases of the Vengeance trilogy. On the Tartan boxset packaging, the version is incorrectly titled "Fade to White version".

Release

Box office
In terms of total admissions, it was the seventh biggest domestic release in Korea that year, and the eighth biggest overall with 3,650,000 tickets sold nationwide. It achieved great financial success.

The film opened in limited release in two North American theatres on 28 April 2006 under the title Lady Vengeance. In its opening weekend, it earned  ( per screen). It grossed  during its entire run, playing on 15 screens during its widest point and grossed  worldwide.

Critical reception
Lady Vengeance has a 76% approval rating on Rotten Tomatoes. The critical consensus states: "Stylistically flashy and gruesomely violent, Sympathy for Lady Vengeance fits in nicely with the other two films of Park's revenge trilogy." It has an average score of 75/100 on Metacritic.

Awards and nominations
2005 Blue Dragon Film Awards 
 Best Film
 Best Actress - Lee Young-ae
 Nomination - Best Director - Park Chan-wook
 Nomination - Best Cinematography - Chung Chung-hoon
 Nomination - Best Lighting - Park Hyun-won
 Nomination - Best Art Direction - Cho Hwa-sung
 Nomination - Best Music - Jo Yeong-wook
 Nomination - Technical Award - Kim Sang-bum, Kim Jae-bum (Editing)

2005 Korean Film Awards
 Nomination - Best Actress - Lee Young-ae
 Nomination - Best Cinematography - Chung Chung-hoon
 Nomination - Best Editing - Kim Sang-bum, Kim Jae-bum
 Nomination - Best Art Direction - Cho Hwa-sung
 Nomination - Best Music - Jo Yeong-wook

2005 Director's Cut Awards
 Best Actress - Lee Young-ae

2006 Baeksang Arts Awards
 Best Actress - Lee Young-ae
 Nomination - Best Film
 Nomination - Best Director - Park Chan-wook

2006 Grand Bell Awards
 Nomination - Best Film
 Nomination - Best Director - Park Chan-wook
 Nomination - Best Actress - Lee Young-ae
 Nomination - Best New Actor - Kim Shi-hoo

2006 Hong Kong Film Awards
 Nomination - Best Asian Film

Appearances in popular culture
 In the 2017 drama series Saimdang, Memoir of Colors, the character Geum Ja made a cameo appearance (portrayed by the same actress) in a dance club.
 Geum-ja was the inspiration behind Oh Geum-ji of Lowlife Princess: Noir.

See also
 List of Korean-language films
 Revenge play

References

External links
 
 
 
 
 
 

2005 films
2005 crime drama films
2005 crime thriller films
2005 psychological thriller films
2005 thriller drama films
Best Picture Blue Dragon Film Award winners
2000s Japanese-language films
2000s Korean-language films
South Korean films about revenge
Films directed by Park Chan-wook
South Korean crime drama films
South Korean crime thriller films
Women in prison films
South Korean films based on actual events
2000s English-language films
2000s South Korean films